James M. Murphy (born November 15, 1969) is an American state legislator serving in the Massachusetts House of Representatives since 2001. He is a Weymouth resident and a member of the Democratic Party. He attended Boston College High School, Merrimack College and Suffolk University Law School.  Before election to the Massachusetts House, he was an Assistant District Attorney for Norfolk County, Massachusetts. He represents the 4th Norfolk district, comprising most of Weymouth and one precinct of Hingham, Massachusetts.

See also
 2019–2020 Massachusetts legislature
 2021–2022 Massachusetts legislature

References

1969 births
Living people
Democratic Party members of the Massachusetts House of Representatives
People from Weymouth, Massachusetts
21st-century American politicians
Boston College High School alumni